KMDL (97.3 FM, "97.3 The Dawg") is a country music-formatted radio station in Lafayette, Louisiana.  It is owned by Townsquare Media.  Its studios are located on Bertrand Road in Lafayette, and its transmitter is located south of Youngsville, Louisiana.

The station is an affiliate of the New Orleans Saints radio network.

History
KMDL began broadcasting August 1, 1981 with 3,000 watts at 97.7. When KMDL signed on, it was a local Kaplan station with a marginal signal over the Lafayette market. In 1991, in an effort to better serve the market as a whole, KMDL upgraded to 40,000 watts and moved to 97.5. The move lasted for a short time, however, as interference forced the station to move back to 97.7 until it was found that the station could move to 97.3 interference-free.

KMDL has been in a country format since first signing on as "K-Middle," in reference to 97.7 appearing in the middle of the dial on an analog radio. After moving to 97.3, KMDL dropped the "K-Middle" branding and identified only using frequency and call letters until shifting from a traditional country format to a current hit-based country format in September 1995, at which it began identifying as "the Dawg," a reference to USL's then-Bulldog mascot.

HD radio
An Ibiquity-licensed station, KMDL began broadcasting HD Radio in November 2007. Currently, KMDL does not multicast.

References

External links

Radio stations in Louisiana
Country radio stations in the United States
Townsquare Media radio stations